John-Edward Kelly (October 7, 1958 – February 12, 2015) was an American conductor and saxophonist.

Born in Fairfield, California, Kelly began music studies in Belleville, Illinois studying clarinet, saxophone, flute and voice. Kelly focused on his passion for the saxophone as he began formal music studies at Florida State University's College of Music; where he launched his quest to resurrect the original tone and range of the saxophone as designed by Adolphe Sax. His teachers included Sigurd Rascher.  Kelly took Rascher's place as alto saxophonist in the Raschèr Saxophone Quartet, with which he regularly performed for 10 years.  Kelly later became a professor of chamber music at the Robert Schumann Academy of Music in Düsseldorf, and a professor of saxophone and contemporary chamber music at the Norwegian Academy of Music in Oslo.  He had a 30-year international career as a classical saxophonist.

Kelly founded the Alloys Ensemble (saxophone, cello, piano & percussion) in 1994 and The Kelly Quartet in 2004.  In 2005, Kelly co-founded the Arcos Orchestra with violinist Elissa Cassini, with a focus on unfamiliar orchestral repertoire.  He also was a professor of contemporary chamber music at the Robert Schumann Academy of Music from 1996 to 2003.  As well, he was professor of saxophone and contemporary chamber music at the Norwegian Academy of Music in Oslo, Norway, from 2000 to 2005.  He lectured and served as a guest professor in such cities as London, The Hague, Hamburg, Düsseldorf, Helsinki, Rochester, Stuttgart, Lyon, Oslo, and.  He published articles on aesthetics, contemporary music and the saxophone, including a pamphlet titled "The Acoustics of the Saxophone from a Phenomenological Perspective".  He also gave a series of lectures titled 'The Art of Listening'.  Kelly was elected to the Royal Swedish Academy of Music in 1999.  

Kelly gave the first performances of more than 200 works for saxophone, including 30 concertos for saxophone and orchestra. His performing repertoire consisted primarily of works written expressly for him.  In 1995 he played the world premiere of Dimitri Terzakis's saxophone concerto, which was broadcast live to 27 nations.  Other composers who have written works for Kelly include: 
Samuel Adler, Kalevi Aho, Osvaldas Balakauskas, Jürg Baur, Erik Bergman, David Blake, John Boda, Thomas Böttger, Herbert Callhoff, Michael Denhoff, Violeta Dinescu, Brian Elias, Anders Eliasson, Werner Wolf Glaser, Sampo Haapamäki, Ingvar Karkoff, Maurice Karkoff, Tristan Keuris, Hans Kox, Nicola LeFanu, Otmar Mácha, Tera de Marez-Oyens, Miklós Maros, Gérard Masson, Roland Leistner-Mayer, Krzysztof Meyer, Gráinne Mulvey, Pehr-Henrik Nordgren, Enrique Raxach, Uros Rojko, Jan Sandström, Sven-David Sandström, Leif Segerstam, Manfred Stahnke, Dimitri Terzakis, Stefan Thomas, Friedrich Voss, and Iannis Xenakis.

Kelly met his wife Kristin, a physician, at a concert in Germany.  The couple married in 2003.  They had 4 children, 3 sons and a daughter.  His widow and children survive him.  In private life, he was a licensed airplane pilot and flight instructor.

Selected discography
 John-Edward Kelly & Bob Versteegh (3 volumes) (1987, 1991, 1994) - Col legno Musikproduktionen AU031805, AU031817, and WWE1CD31885
 Works for Saxophone & Orchestra by Ibert, Larsson, & Martin, BMG (with the Ostrobothnian Chamber Orchestra) (1991) - Arte Nova 74321277
 Miklós Maros Saxophone Concerto (with the Prague Radio Symphony Orchestra) (1990) - Phono Suecia PS-CD-23
 Pehr Henrik Nordgren Saxophone Concerto (with the Ostrobothnian Chamber Orchestra) (1995) - Finlandia 3984233922
 Allan Pettersson Symphony No. 16 (with the Sinfonie-Orchester des Saarländischen Rundfunks) (1995) - CPO 9992842
 Jan Sandström - My Assam Dragon (with the Swedish Radio Symphony Orchestra (1995) - Phono Suecia PSCD87
John-Edward Kelly Alone (1999) - Emergo Classics EC39322
 Hans Kox - Concertino (with the Norwegian Winds) (1991) - Attaca-Babel 92621
 Hans Kox - Through a Glass, Darkly (1992) - Attaca-Babel 9374
 Viktor Ullmann - Slawische Rhapsodie (with the Deutsches Symphonie-Orchester Berlin) (1998) - Orfeo C419981A
 Tristan Keuris - Laudi (with the Radio Philharmonic Orchestra) (1994) - Emergo Classics EC39332
 Dimitri Terzakis - Konflikte (1997) - ProViva 7198585 (ISVP185CD)
 Tristan Keuris - Three Sonnets (2001)
 Anders Eliasson - Symphony No. 3 (2001)
 Anders Eliasson - Desert Point / Ostacoli / Sinfonia Per Achi (with Arcos Orchestra, conductor: John-Edward Kelly)  (2008) - NEOS SACD 10813
 Pehr Henrik Nordgren - Phantasme (2001)
 Hans Kox - Face-to-Face (2001)
 The Alloys Ensemble (2001)

References

External links
 
 Official page of the Arcos Orchestra
 Christoph Schlüren, "'Unwilling to Compromise' – Zum Tod von John-Edward Kelly".  NMZ Online, 20 February 2015 (German-language tribute)

1958 births
2015 deaths
20th-century German musicians
American classical saxophonists
American male saxophonists
German classical musicians
20th-century American saxophonists
20th-century American male musicians
20th-century classical musicians